The Altun-Alem Mosque (litreally 'Golden Gem Mosque') is a mosque located in Novi Pazar, Serbia.

Abdul Gani, an architect, constructed the Altun-Alem Mosque in the first half of the 16th century.

See also
Islam in Serbia
Islamic architecture
List of mosques

References 

Mosques in Serbia
16th-century mosques
Ottoman architecture in Serbia
16th-century establishments in Serbia
Mosque buildings with domes
Cultural Monuments of Great Importance (Serbia)